The Roman Catholic Diocese of Covington is a Roman Catholic diocese in Northern Kentucky, covering 3,359 square miles (8,700 km2) that includes the city of Covington and the Kentucky counties of Boone, Kenton, Campbell, Gallatin, Carroll, Grant, Owen, Pendleton, Harrison, Bracken, Robertson, Mason, Fleming, and Lewis. The cathedral church of the diocese is the Cathedral Basilica of the Assumption. On July 13, 2021 Pope Francis appointed Monsignor John Iffert, a priest of the Diocese of Belleville, as bishop-elect of Covington.

History
Pope Pius IX erected the Diocese of Covington on July 29, 1853, taking its territory from the Diocese of Louisville, and appointing the president of Xavier University in Cincinnati, George Aloysius Carrell, S.J., as its first bishop. The diocese originally consisted of the eastern half of Kentucky, with the Diocese of Louisville containing the western half.

Historically, the Catholic population of the diocese was composed primarily of descendants of German immigrants in the towns of Covington and Newport in the mid-19th century, who came to the United States in the wake of the German revolutions of 1848–49. The Catholic communities of Cincinnati and Louisville had a similar demographic. Much of the parish architecture in the diocese reflects this German cultural heritage.

On 10 December 1937, Pope Pius XI elevated the Diocese of Louisville to a metropolitan archdiocese, designating the Diocese of Covington as one of its suffragans.

On 14 January 1988, Pope John Paul II erected the Diocese of Lexington, taking its territory from the Archdiocese of Louisville and the Diocese of Covington.  This action established the present territory of the diocese.

Clergy sexual abuse
In 2009, it was reported that 243 victims of clergy sexual abuse had received an average of $254,000 each, totaling approximately $79 million.  Perpetrators included 35 priests. In November 2019, it was reported that when the 2009 settlement was finalized, it totaled $90.5 million.

In the early 21st century, the Roman Catholic Church in the United States was revealed to have covered up widespread sexual abuse of minors by priests that occurred in numerous dioceses; the scandal was first investigated in Boston, Massachusetts. In 2005 the Diocese of Covington announced that it had settled with more than 100 victims of sexual abuse by paying approximately $120 million.  The diocese agreed that any person who claimed to have been sexually abused by a member of the clergy or a lay employee could seek compensation regardless of when the alleged abuse occurred. Under terms of the settlement, victims would be placed into one of four categories, depending upon the severity of their abuse. Payments would range from $5,000 to $450,000 for each victim, minus attorneys' fees.  This was the largest settlement for any Roman Catholic diocese in the United States at the time. The diocese acquired $40 million by liquidating real estate assets, including the Marydale Retreat Center in Erlanger, and other investments. The remaining $80 million was paid by its insurance carriers.  Additionally, Bishop Foys vowed to meet with every victim of abuse who was willing to meet, saying, "Those harmed by these shameful, despicable deeds now need the institutional Church and, more importantly, the pastoral Church to provide as much comfort and peace as possible. Our hearts must remain open, like Christ's."

In August 2019, Rev. David Glockner was arrested after being accused of inappropriately touching two high school girls who were volunteering in a construction project at a farm in Vanceburg. Shortly after his arrest, the Diocese removed Glockner from ministry at his parish. In February of 2020, Father Glockner was cleared of any wrongdoing, and the charges against him were dismissed as not credible.  He was restored to ministry at the parish in Vanceburg.

On July 31, 2020, the Diocese of Covington released a report on sexual abuse which found that 59 Catholic priests and 31 others associated with the church had sexually abused children since at least 1950. However, it was reported in November 2019 that 92 priests and brothers who served in the Diocese of Covington were accused of sexual abuse by not just the Vatican, but also prosecutors and civil litigation since 1959.

Bishops

Bishops of Covington
The list of ordinaries of the diocese and their years of service:
 George Aloysius Carrell, S.J. (1853–1868)
 Augustus Toebbe (1869–1884)
 Camillus Paul Maes (1884–1915)
 Ferdinand Brossart (1915–1923)
 Francis William Howard (1923–1944)
 William Theodore Mulloy (1944–1959)
 Richard Henry Ackerman, C.S.Sp. (1960–1978)
 William Anthony Hughes (1979–1995)
 Robert William Muench (1996–2001), appointed Bishop of Baton Rouge
 Roger Joseph Foys (2002–2021)
 John C. Iffert (2021-present)

Former auxiliary bishop
 James Kendrick Williams (1984–1988), appointed Bishop of Lexington

Statistics
As of 2013, the diocese held 92,456 Catholics out of a population of 513,971, about 18% of the population of its territory. The diocese contains 47 parishes and 6 missions in 14 counties, the majority of which are concentrated in Boone, Kenton, and Campbell Counties. As of 2006, there were 83 diocesan priests, 9 religious priests, 28 permanent deacons, 346 religious sisters, and 16 religious brothers. The diocese also supports a private collegial institution, Thomas More University in Crestview Hills.  In addition, the diocese also administers six area medical centers under the St. Elizabeth Healthcare system. The diocese also administers 28 cemeteries.

Parishes
 Cathedral Basilica of the Assumption — Covington
 Cristo Rey — Erlanger, Kentucky
 Saint Agnes — Fort Wright
 Saint Augustine — Covington
 Saint Augustine — Augusta
 Saint Patrick — Taylor Mill
 Saint Patrick — Maysville
 Saint Anthony — Taylor Mill
 Saint Catherine — Fort Thomas
 All Saints — Walton
 Blessed Sacrament — Fort Mitchell
 Saint Joseph — Crescent Springs
 Saint Joseph — Cold Spring
 Saint Joseph — Camp Springs
 Saint Joseph — Warsaw
 Saint Benedict — Covington
 Holy Cross — Latonia
 Holy Spirit Parish, Saint Stephens Church — Newport
 Immaculate Heart Of Mary — Burlington
 Mary, Queen of Heaven — Erlanger
 Mother of God — Covington
 Saint Henry — Elsmere
 Saint John the Baptist — Wilder
 Saint Mary of the Assumption — Alexandria
 Saint Paul — Florence
 Saint Pius X — Edgewood
 Saint Timothy — Union
 Saint Therese — Southgate
 Saint Thomas — Fort Thomas
 Saint John — Covington
 Saint Bernard — Dayton
 Saints Peter and Paul — California
 Saints Boniface and James — Ludlow
 Saint Cecilia — Independence
 Saint Barbara — Erlanger
 Divine Mercy (formerly Sacred Heart and Saint Anthony) — Bellevue
 Holy Redeemer — Vanceburg
 Saint James — Brooksville
 Saint Charles — Flemingsburg
 Saint Edward — Cynthiana
 Saint Francis Xavier — Falmouth
 Saint John — Carrollton
 Saint Matthew — Kenton
 Saint Philip — Melbourne
 Saint Rose of Lima — Mays Lick
 Saint William — Williamstown
 Our Lady of Lourdes — Park Hills, Kentucky (Latin Mass Parish)

Education system
The Diocese of Covington contains thirty-nine educational institutions. They are administered either independently, by the diocesan school board, by the parish with which they are affiliated, or by a religious order. In total, in 2013 there were 14,284 students under Catholic instruction.

Thomas More University

High schools
St. Henry District High School, Erlanger
Covington Catholic High School, Park Hills (all boys)
Bishop Brossart High School, Alexandria
Villa Madonna Academy, Villa Hills
Covington Latin School, Covington
Notre Dame Academy, Park Hills (all girls)
Holy Cross High School, Covington
Newport Central Catholic High School, Newport
St. Patrick's High School, Maysville
 Assumption Academy, Walton, Kentucky

See also

 Catholic Church by country
 Hierarchy of the Catholic Church
 List of Catholic dioceses in the United States

References

External links
Roman Catholic Diocese of Covington Official Site
 
 
1910 Catholic Encyclopedia article on the Diocese of Covington

 
1853 establishments in Kentucky
Covington
Catholic Church in Kentucky
Covington
Covington
Roman Catholic Ecclesiastical Province of Louisville